Fight or Flight is the debut studio album by American pop singer-songwriter Emily Osment. The album was released in Canada on September 28, 2010, and in the US October 5, 2010 by Wind-Up Records. She has worked with producers from her previous musical efforts such as Matthew Bair, as well as Toby Gad, Nellee Hooper and Mandi Perkins. Fight or Flight mainly draws from the genre of electropop while having a dance-pop feel, and containing dancehall and techno, among other influences.

The album has received generally positive reviews from critics, with most stating it is an improvement from her debut EP All the Right Wrongs. The album  peaked at number seventy-two in Spain and debuted in the US at number 170 on the Billboard 200 chart. The single "Let's Be Friends", debuted and peaked at number twenty-four on the Billboard Japan Hot 100 chart, making the song Osment's first top-thirty hit as a single and her most successful single to date. In addition, the single was also successful in Germany, peaking at number sixty-seven and remained in the German chart for over six weeks. The follow up single, "Lovesick", was also a commercial success, peaking at number sixty-six in Canada, making it her highest charting single there. It also became her first to chart in the UK, where it peaked at number fifty-seven.

Osment promoted the album mainly through musical performances and touring. She has performed the album's lead single, "Let's Be Friends" on The Dome 55 in Germany, as well as on the Canadian television show Toronto Breakfast Television, in which the song was performed acoustically. The single was also premiered and performed live during her Clap Your Hands Tour during 2010. On December 23, 2010, Osment performed the album's second official single, "Lovesick" on The View. During 2011, she performed on several television networks in Germany in support of the album. The performances included Osment performing "Lovesick", and one performance saw Osment performing her previous single, "All the Way Up".

Background
In an interview with disneydreaming.com, Osment stated that she had begun working on the album in October, and had quickly rushed to finish it. In the interview, she revealed that she had co-written a song for the album, titled "1-800 Clap Your Hands", and that it would possibly be on her upcoming album. In December 2009, Osment announced plans to start work on her full-length debut album, after promotion for All the Right Wrongs had ended. She continued to write songs while filming the third season of Hannah Montana. She stated that the sound on the album would be different than the music heard on her debut extended play, calling it more of a "mature" sound.

On March 24, Osment confirmed on Good Day NY that her debut album was set to be released in the Summer 2010. On June 7, 2010, Osment premiered the album's lead single, "Let's Be Friends" on JSYK.com. On June 3, Osment announced that the album was being pushed back for release in the fall, and later confirmed the album's release date to be October 5, 2010, as well as announcing the official title to be Fight or Flight. The cover art was revealed August 17, and the track list being revealed on August 20. When asked about the title of the album, Osment stated

The music video for "Let's Be Friends" debuted on Osment's official website on August 23, 2010. She performed the single on The Dome 55. On September 7, the album's second single, "Lovesick", debuted on JSYK.com to generally positive reviews. It was sent to radio on October 19, 2010 and the music video was released on January 14, 2011.

Composition
The album has primarily a dance-pop feel to it, unlike her previous songs. Seventeen Magazine said of the album's composition, " In her first single, “All The Way Up,” she told us, “I like to keep my suitcase packed, cause I’m going far,” and that, she has! Emily has strayed away from her first EP, “All The Right Wrongs” indie vibe, giving her new eleven-song album a more pop-dance feel. The name "Fight or Flight" comes from, Emily's own ambitions to fight through personal anxieties to achieve simultaneous success in two very competitive fields.  The first single from Fight or Flight, “Let’s Be Friends,” showcases Emily's ability to make a hit pop-rock song, without sounding manufactured or over-produced. The song has been a popular hit on radio airwaves across the U.S. Other songs likely to be hit singles are "Lovesick," "Truth or Dare," and "All The Boys Want." She slows it down and shows off her vocal ability in "Marisol" and "You Get Me Through." "Right now/live out loud/gotta believe in something," she says in her call-to-action song, "Gotta Believe in Something." If you're in the mood for a high energetic, fun, feel-good song, go right to "Double Talk" or "Get Yer Yah-Yah’s Out." Her song, "1-800 Clap Your Hands (The Water Is Rising)" goes psychedelic-funk while "The Cycle" takes you back to her first EP's alternative-pop feel.

During an interview about the album's musical content, Osment stated,

SparklingStars commented the album's dance melody, stating, "The track “Lovesick” has a great dance beat to it that will get you off your feet and moving, as well as the songs “Get Yer Yah-Yah’s Out” and “The Cycle.” You Get Me Through and Marisol are the two softer tunes on the album, however I found “You Get Me Through” to be a bit too slow. Marisol on the other hand is an amazing song and Emily's voice sounded beautiful. The songs “Double Talk” and “Truth or Dare” had the same beat to me but they work well with the over all sound of the album; and they are the typical club songs that party goes will jam too. The two tracks I believe has the catchiest beats and lyrics are “All the Boys Want” and “Gotta Believe in Something;” they are must listens. But the outcast song is “1-800 Clap Your Hands (The Water is Rising),” I don't really get the sound of the tune although it might fit with the album something is off with it and I would have preferred them to add another softer track instead. Overall if you're looking for good album to play at your next house party check this one. Emily does take a risk by going into a new path with her music early on but it seem like she knows what style she wants to take on; and after all this is only the first of many records to come I'm sure of it."

Reception

Critical reception

The album has been met with generally positive reviews from critics. AllMusic praised Osment and the album, stating, "Fight or Flight sounds like Katy Perry with a sneer, with a sexual undercurrent that runs beneath every song and bubbles to the surface quite often."

Chart performance
The album peaked at number ten in Brazil and seventy-two in Spain, making the album Osment's first top-ten hit. In the US, it debuted at number 170 on the Billboard 200. It reached number 2 on the Top Heatseekers album chart.

Promotion
Osment promoted the album mainly through musical performances and touring. She has performed the album's lead single, "Let's Be Friends" on The Dome 55 in Germany, as well as on the Canadian television show Toronto Breakfast Television, in which the song was performed acoustically. The single was also premiered and performed live during her "Clap Your Hands Tour" during 2010. On December 23, 2010, Osment performed the album's second official single, Lovesick on The View. During 2011, she performed on several television networks in Germany in support of the album. The performances included Osment performing Lovesick, and one performance saw Osment performing her previous single, All the Way Up.

Singles
"Let's Be Friends" was released as the album's lead single. The song was released for digital download on June 8, 2010, and sent for radio airplay on July 7, 2010. Despite a mixed critical reception, "Let's Be Friends" was met with some commercial success. The single debuted and peaked at number twenty-four on the Billboard Japan Hot 100 chart. In Germany, the single became her first to chart there, when it debut at number 84, and later rose to a peak of 67. In addition, the single became her first to chart on an official US singles chart, when it peaked at number 31 on the Billboard Hot Dance Club Play chart.

"Lovesick" was released on October 19, 2010 as the album's second single. Due to the strong digital downloads the song received, the song debuted at number 165 on the UK Singles Chart. During the week of April 17, 2011, the single entered the Top 100 in the UK, reaching a peak of 67 on the chart. The single also became her second to achieve success on the Canadian Hot 100, where it debuted at number 71, and later rose to a peak of 66.

Track listing

Personnel
Credits for Fight or Flight adapted from Allmusic

Ron Aniello — composer
Jake Gosling — keyboards, programming
Chris Graham — A&R
Chris Leonard — guitar
Nicholas Gross — drums, keyboards, programming
Anthony Vasquez — drums, keyboarding, programming
Zachary Rae — keyboards
Nellee Hooper — composer, keyboards, producer, vocal producer
Scott Hull — mastering

Oliver Leiber — composer
Michelle Lukianovich — art direction, package design
Diana Meltzer — A&R
Mike Mongillo — product manager
Emily Osment — composer, vocals
Bethany Pawluk — art direction
Mandi Perkins — composer
Shelly Peiken — composer
Lindy Robbins — composer
Ian Rossiter — engineer
Adam Schlesinger — composer, vocal producer
Brigette Sire — photography
Gregg Wattenberg — A&R, production supervisor

Charts

Release history

References

2010 debut albums
Albums produced by Nellee Hooper
Albums produced by Toby Gad
Emily Osment albums
Wind-up Records albums